FC Ordabasy is a professional football club from Kazakhstan based at the K. Munaitpasov Stadium in Shymkent. Ordabasy was formed in 1949, following the merger of two existing Kazakhstan Premier League sides, FC Zhiger and FC Tomiris.

History
FC Dostyk was formed as the merger of FC Zhiger and FC Tomiris at the middle of 2000 season and then renamed FC Ordabasy before the start of 2003 season,

On 5 February 2017, Aleksei Petrushin replaced Bakhtiyar Bayseitov as the club's manager.

Ordabasy holds the history of both Zhiger and Tomiris:

Zhiger
1949 : Founded as Dinamo
1960 : Renamed Yenbek
1961 : Renamed Metallurg
1981 : Renamed Meliorator
1992 : Renamed Zhiger

Tomiris
1992 : Founded as SKIF-Arsenal
1993 : Renamed SKIF-Ordabasy
1998 : Renamed Tomiris
1999 : Renamed Sintez
2000 : Renamed Tomiris

Domestic history

Continental history

Honours
Kazakhstan First Division (2): 1998 (Tomiris), 2001 (Dostyk)

Kazakhstan Cup (2): 2011, 2022

Kazakhstan Super Cup (1): 2012

Squad

On Loan

See also
 Kazakhstani football clubs in European competitions

References

External links
Official website

 
Football clubs in Kazakhstan
Sport in Shymkent
Association football clubs established in 1949
1949 establishments in the Kazakh Soviet Socialist Republic